Ardashir "Ardu" Vakil is an Indian-born British author whose first novel, Beach Boy, won the Betty Trask Award in 1997 and was shortlisted for the Whitbread First Novel Award.  His second novel, One Day was shortlisted for the Encore Award.

Education
Born in 1962 in Bombay and educated at The Doon School, and University of Cambridge, he has lived in London since 1997 with his wife and two children.  He teaches Creative Writing at Goldsmiths, University of London.

Works

References

1962 births
Living people
Indian emigrants to the United Kingdom
Parsi writers
Parsi people
Indian male novelists
Academics of the University of East Anglia
The Doon School alumni
British people of Parsi descent
British Zoroastrians